Dudu-Osun is an African black soap made from herbs found in the Savannah and tropical rainforest regions of West Africa. Although the black soap was once only known to people of Yoruba descents. Dudu-Osun, a Nigerian variant of the soap is among the few brands making for wider acceptance and recognition for this beauty product in the mainstream industry.

Overview 
Dudu-Osun is made from shea butter, honey, aloe vera, Osun (camwood), palm kernel oil, cocoa pod ash, palm bunch ash, lime juice, lemon juice, water and fragrance.

The soap is known to be a gentle cleanser for hair, scalp and skin. Camwood, which is a primary ingredient in this locally made herbal soap has been discovered with exfoliating properties.

For years, beauty experts have claimed traditional black soap is good at alleviating skin ailments and even protecting the skin from premature ageing.

Tropical Naturals Limited, the manufacturer of Dudu-Osun was first founded by Abiola Ogunrinde as Cosmos Chemicals Limited in 1995 and became fully operational with the new name in 2007, when it decided to focus on the production of natural beauty products. Dudu-Osun is the company’s flagship product.

The manufacturers of Dudu-Osun have produced other beauty products under the same name due to the success of their black soap. This includes moisturizing lotions, shea butter, and a variant of the Dudu-Osun soap called 'Spa Vivent' developed for the German and Scandinavian market.

Dudu-Osun is owned by Tropical Naturals Limited, a manufacturing company that started as a small-scale manually-operated plant in 1995, with Dudu-Osun being the flagship product.

Origin 
Dudu-Osun finds its origin with the Yoruba people in Nigeria, Benin and Togo.

The name Dudu Osun is derived from two Yoruba words “osun” (camwood) and “dudu” (black). This translates as “camwood soap”, although “osun” can also be translated as “ose” which means soap. This translates as “black soap”.

Manufacturing Process 
Generally, traditional black soap is made from the ash of locally harvested barks and plants.

Dudu-Osun, however, derives its primary ingredient from Camwood, a  tree from West Africa. The tree’s bark is pounded and ground into a smooth powder form, which is then made into a paste. The camwood paste is added to the rest of the mixture that includes aloe vera, lime juice, honey, etc.  This mixture is cooked and stirred till it solidifies before the soap is moulded to shape.

References

External links 
 Dudu-Osun on Facebook

Soap brands
Nigerian brands
Yoruba culture